Schwab's Pharmacy was a drugstore located at 8024 Sunset Boulevard in Hollywood, California, and was a popular hangout for movie actors and movie industry dealmakers from the 1930s through the 1950s.

History
Opened in 1932 by the Schwab brothers, Schwab's Pharmacy in Hollywood became the most famous and longest-operating outlet of their small retail chain.  Like many drug stores in the United States during the mid-twentieth century, Schwab's sold medicines and had a counter serving ice cream dishes and light meals.

Schwab's closed in October 1983. Five years later, on October 6, 1988, the building was demolished to make way for a shopping complex and multiplex theater.

Sidney Skolsky, a syndicated Hollywood gossip columnist for the New York Daily News who was the first journalist to use the nickname "Oscar" for the Academy Award in print, made Schwab's famous in the 1930s. He used the drugstore as his office and called his column in Photoplay, the premier movie magazine in the United States at the time, "From a Stool at Schwab's."

A persistent Hollywood legend has it that actress Lana Turner was "discovered" by director Mervyn LeRoy while at the soda counter at Schwab's. While the 16-year-old Turner was discovered at a soda counter, the location was not Schwab's but another establishment, the Top Hat Cafe, farther east on Sunset Boulevard at McCadden Place, directly across the street from Hollywood High School, where she was still a student. The person who discovered her was not LeRoy but Hollywood Reporter publisher William Wilkerson.

Today, there is a replica of the establishment at Universal Studios Florida that sells Häagen-Dazs ice cream and drinks.

In popular media
Schwab's appears in the 1949 Doris Day films My Dream is Yours and It's a Great Feeling, and the 1950 film Sunset Boulevard. It is also shown and mentioned in the television program, The Andy Griffith Show (1965, season 6, episode 8, "Taylors in Hollywood").

Schwab's is referenced in the 1964 hit song by Jan and Dean, Dead Man's Curve. The song describes a fictional race down West Sunset Blvd where they "flew past La Brea, Schwab's and Crescent Heights".

The drugstore also features amongst the rambling lyrics of Invitation to the Blues by Tom Waits.

Schwab's Pharmacy appears in the Netflix limited series, Hollywood. Jack Castello's wife, Henrietta is shown to work at the store, alongside coworker Erwin Kaye.

In the ninth episode of first season of  The Newsroom, Don Keefer mentions the legend of Lana Turner discovered sitting at a drugstore while introducing an agent who hypes up news stories.

References

External links

Defunct restaurants in Hollywood, Los Angeles
Commercial buildings in Los Angeles
Defunct pharmacies of the United States
Demolished buildings and structures in Los Angeles
Demolished buildings and structures in California
Health care companies based in California
Buildings and structures demolished in 1988